The Adventures of Three Russians and Three Englishmen in South Africa is a novel by Jules Verne published in 1872.

Plot introduction
Three Russian and three English scientists depart to South Africa to measure the 24th meridian east. As their mission is proceeding, the Crimean War breaks out, and the members of the expedition find themselves citizens of enemy countries.
This novel can be found under alternate titles such as Adventures in the Land of the Behemoth, Measuring a Meridian, and Meridiana or Adventures in South Africa. Interestingly, the travellers, on their homeward journey, reach Victoria Falls on 25 May, 1855, thus anticipating the discovery by David Livingstone by nearly six months.

External links

 

 52 Illustrations by Jules Férat

1872 French novels
Novels by Jules Verne
South Africa in fiction
Novels set in South Africa